The 1960–61 season was Fussball Club Basel 1893's 67th season in their existence. It was their 15th consecutive season in the top flight of Swiss football since their promotion from the Nationalliga B the season 1945–46. They played their home games in the Landhof, in the Wettstein Quarter in Kleinbasel. Ernst Weber was the club's chairman for his second consecutive season.

Overview 
Jenő Vincze was Basel's team manager for the second season. The West German ex-international footballer Gerhard Siedl joined the team from Bayern Munich during the summer off-season, but he was to leave the club again during the winter break. Hanspeter Stocker joined the team, coming from third tier local club Concordia Basel. Two further new players were Antonio Danani coming from FC Moutier and Fernando Von Krannichfeldt who signed in from FC Mendrisiostar. In the other direction midfielder Jean-Jacques Maurer moved to Servette, allrounder Otto Ludwig moved to third tier local club Old Boys, and forward Roberto "Mucho" Frigerio moved on to score his goals for La Chaux-de-Fonds. Another player who left the squad was defender Werner Bopp who moved on to Nordstern Basel and retired. Bopp had played 16 seasons for Basel, playing in 321 league and 43 cup matches scoring 15 goals during these appearances.

Basel played a total of 43 games this season. Of these 43 matches 26 were in the domestic league, one was in the Swiss Cup and 16 were friendly matches. Of these test matches five were played as hosts and 11 were played away, 12 were won, two were drawn and two ended with a defeat. The team scored 55 goals and conceded 29. The two defeats were suffered at the Landhof against VfR Mannheim and in the St. Jakob Stadium against Santos. The match against Santos was one of the highlights of these test games despite the 2–8 defeat. Gottlieb Stäuble and Josef Hügi scored the goals for Basel. Coutinho scored five and Pelé scored three for Santos. 14,000 spectators paid for a ticket to see the game, much needed money in the bad financial situation that the club was suffering.

Fourteen teams contested the 1960–61 Nationalliga A, these were the top 12 teams from the previous season and the two newly promoted teams Young Fellows Zürich and Fribourg. The Championship was played in a double round-robin, the champions were to be qualified for 1961–62 European Cup and the last two teams in the table were to be relegated. Despite a home defeat against Young Fellows in the very first match, Basel started the season well, winning six of their first eight matches. But then came a run with six consecutive defeats in which the team failed to score a single goal. Basel slipped from the table top down to the relegation zone before they managed to return to winning games. Basel ended the season in 5th position with 28 points, but were 18 points behind the new Swiss Champions Servette. Basel were appointed as one of four Swiss representatives in the newly founded International Football Cup, which was to take place in the summer break after the end of this season. The other three teams who competed in the 1961–62 International Football Cup were La Chaux-de-Fonds, Grenchen and Zürich.  

Basel entered the Swiss Cup in the third principal round. They were drawn away against third tier local club Concordia Basel and for Basel the game ended in a fiasco. Despite an early 1–0 lead and in total 18–0 corners, Werner Decker and Heinz Wirz each scored for the under dogs who had a very young Karl Odermatt in their team. Basel lost 2–1 and were eliminated form the competition. Odermatt's football skills were noted, later he and Decker would later transfer to Basel.

Players  
The following is the list of the Basel first team squad during the season 1960–61. The list includes players that were in the squad on the day that the Nationalliga A season started on 28 August 1960 but subsequently left the club after that date.

 

 
 

 

 

   

Players who left the squad

Results 

Legend

Friendly matches

Preseason

Winter break and mid-season

Nationalliga A

League matches

League table

Swiss Cup

See also 
 History of FC Basel
 List of FC Basel players
 List of FC Basel seasons

References

Sources 
 Die ersten 125 Jahre. Publisher: Josef Zindel im Friedrich Reinhardt Verlag, Basel. 
 The FCB team 1960–61 at fcb-archiv.ch
 Switzerland 1960–61 by Erik Garin at Rec.Sport.Soccer Statistics Foundation

External links 
 FC Basel official site

FC Basel seasons
Basel